Commander Cody may refer to:

Name
Commander Cody the stage name of George Frayne, leader of the country rock band Commander Cody and His Lost Planet Airmen, and, informally, the band itself
 Commander Cody, a clone trooper from the Star Wars franchise.

See also
Commando Cody, titular character of the eponymous 1950s science-fiction serial 
Commando Cody: Sky Marshal of the Universe, a Republic Pictures multi-chapter movie serial which began as a proposed syndicated television series
Space Patrol (1950 TV series), whose star character was Commander Corry
Cody (disambiguation)